The 2011 Grand Prix Cycliste de Québec was the second edition of the Grand Prix Cycliste de Québec, a single-day professional bicycle road race. It was the 24th event of the 2011 UCI World Tour season.

 rider Philippe Gilbert achieved his 17th race win of the season after launching several late-race attacks. Gilbert moved clear on the penultimate circuit but was pulled back to a lead group with nine other riders, before making his final move on the Côte de la Potasse and only Robert Gesink of  – who finished third in the 2010 event – remained in touch with Gilbert at the finish; finishing in the same time. 's Rigoberto Urán completed the podium, nine seconds down on Gilbert and Gesink.

Course
The race consisted of 16 laps of a circuit  in length, an increase of one lap from the 2010 running of the race. The circuit is well-suited for climbers and those who are used to steep descents. The finish was on an uphill climb, that was located on Grand-Allée, in the heart of Old Québec.

Teams
As the race was held under the auspices of the UCI World Tour, all eighteen ProTour teams were invited automatically.

The 22 teams invited to the race were:

Results

References

External links
 

2011
2011 UCI World Tour
Grand Prix Cycliste de Quebec
2011 in Quebec
September 2011 sports events in Canada